The rufous treecreeper (Climacteris rufus) is a species of bird in the family Climacteridae. It is endemic to Australia.

Its natural habitats are temperate forests and subtropical or tropical moist lowland forests.

Description 
It is gray with a rufous face and breast and brown back. The male has dark streaks on his breast while the female has pale streaks.

Diet 
It forages on the trunks and branches of Eucalyptus trees for insects.

References

External links
Image at ADW

rufous treecreeper
Birds of South Australia
Birds of Western Australia
Endemic birds of Australia
rufous treecreeper
Taxonomy articles created by Polbot